The Sverige-class coastal defence ships were a class of  coastal defence ships that, at the time of introduction, were the largest ships to serve in the Swedish Navy. Their design was completely new and was influenced by the ships of the time. Their armament consisted of four /45 cal. Bofors guns in two turrets and eight  Bofors guns in one double and six single turrets. During the Second World War they were the backbone of the Swedish Navy.

Specifications

Displacement
 
6,852 tons standard;
7,516 tons full load,
7,080 tons - Jane's Fighting Ships 1938
 Sverige reconstructed 1932-1933
  and :
7,125 tons standard
7,633 tons full load
7,120 tons - Drottning Victoria - Jane's Fighting Ships 1938
7,275 tons - Gustaf V - Jane's Fighting Ships 1938
Gustaf V reconstructed 1929-1930, modernized 1937
Drottning Victoria reconstructed 1935

Dimensions
Length:  - Sverige
Length:  - Drottning Victoria and Gustaf V
Breadth: 
Draught:  - Sverige
Draught:  - Drottning Victoria and Gustaf V

Armour
 Main belt:  between barbettes, then  and  sections
 Upper belt:  from just behind fore barbette to aft barbette
 Main turret:  front,  side,  roof
 Main barbettes: 
 Secondary turrets: 
 Secondary barbettes: 
 Conning Tower: 
 Deck:

Machinery
4 shafts; Curtis direct-coupled turbines 20,000 SHP in Sverige; 12 Yarrow-type coal-fired boilers
2 shafts; Westinghouse geared turbines manufactured by Motala Company in Gustaf V and Drottning Victoria 22,000 SHP; 12 Yarrow-type coal-fired boilers
 All ships were upgraded to oil-fired boilers in the 1930s (In Gustaf V and Drottning Victoria it was, however, for strategic reasons decided to keep the ability to burn coal to secure their ability to operate on alternative fuel if the Swedish oil supply was cut off)

Armament

As built
4 ×  45 cal. Bofors guns (2 twin turrets), load in 17 seconds, rated as cramped, dividing partition between guns
8 ×  50 cal. Bofors QF guns (1 twin turret superfiring over the forward 283 mm battery, and 6 single turrets, 3 on each beam)
4 ×  Bofors AA cannons mounted forward of the rear 283 mm battery
2 ×  short-barreled Bofors cannons (6 pdr.)
9 ×  MG
2 ×  torpedo tubes

Modernizations
 The underwater torpedo tubes were removed, and the underwater torpedo room was converted into an artillery central to serve the installation of modern range meters and fire control equipment for heavy, secondary and AA-gunnery
 All small gunnery and 2  guns were removed and replaced with modern Bofors 75mm, 40mm and 20mm anti aircraft gunnery.
 The range of the  main artillery was upgraded by new ammunition.
450 complement after reconstruction

Appearance
All three ships looked similar until reconstruction. Gustav V had funnels trunked into one and the upper works modified heavily. Sverige had the fore funnel trunked back away from the superstructure which was modified, and kept the second funnel, making the ships very different in appearance between the main turrets.
Gustav V also had her forward superfiring twin  turret removed, and replaced with a platform for gyro-stabilized AA artillery ( 4 x 40 mm bofors) while Sverige and Drottning Victoria had their midship single  guns removed and replaced with gyro-stabilized AA platforms (Bofors 40 mm double mountings)

Ships
Three of these ships were built:
  was ordered in 1912 and completed in 1917, built by Götaverken Gothenborg. She was paid for by public subscription as the Swedish people's gift to the country.
  ("Queen Victoria") was ordered in 1915 and completed in 1921, built by Götaverken Gothenborg. She had an improved design, with an icebreaking bow and different machinery.
  was ordered in 1915 and completed in 1922, built by Kockums shipyard in Malmö. She had the same improved design as Drottning Victoria.

A fourth ship was considered but not built due to economic difficulties.

The ships were modernised in the 1930s with oil-fired boilers replacing the old coal-fired boilers, removal of underwater torpedo equipment, new anti-aircraft guns, and new fire control equipment.

Plans were drawn up in the 1940s to modernize Drottning Victoria by rebuilding the superstructure, increasing the elevation of the main turrets to 32 degrees, and replacing the armament light armament with 2 twin 57mm guns and 12 40mm/56 Bofors guns in 4 twin and 4 single mounts, as well as 10 25mm Bofors mounts. This would have more than doubled the weight of anti-aircraft fire per minute. These plans were never undertaken. The plans and an essay explaining them can be viewed in here on pages 103 to 113.

Tactical doctrine and effectiveness 

The Sverige-class ships differed in several ways from the classical coastal defence ship: at first by heavier armament as well as better speed and armour, but still small enough to operate and hide in the archipelagos and shallow waters. But the main difference was to be noted in their tactical doctrine and operations. Unlike other coastal defence ships, the Sverige class formed the core of a traditional open-sea battle group (Coastal Fleet), operating with cruisers, destroyers, torpedo boats and air reconnaissance like traditional battleship tactics of the time. This "mini battle group" had no intention, nor need, to challenge the superpowers in blue sea battles, but rather to operate as defensive shield against any aggression challenging Swedish interests and territory. Based on the doctrine that one needs a battle group to challenge a battle group, the Coastal Fleet presented a considerable obstacle to anything smaller than a full-size battleship or battlecruiser, but in a tactical situation where full-size battleships would have very limited operational space exposing them to submarines, fast torpedo crafts, land based dive-bombers and minefields.

References

External links

 Swedish Steel at Dieselpunks.com

 
Coastal defense ship classes
World War II coastal defence ships